The canton of Scey-sur-Saône-et-Saint-Albin is an administrative division of the Haute-Saône department, northeastern France. Its borders were modified at the French canton reorganisation which came into effect in March 2015. Its seat is in Scey-sur-Saône-et-Saint-Albin.

It consists of the following communes:
 
Aroz
Baignes
Les Bâties
Beaujeu-Saint-Vallier-Pierrejux-et-Quitteur
Bourguignon-lès-la-Charité
Boursières
Bucey-lès-Traves
Chantes
La Chapelle-Saint-Quillain
Chassey-lès-Scey
Chemilly
Clans
Étrelles-et-la-Montbleuse
Ferrières-lès-Scey
Frasne-le-Château
Fresne-Saint-Mamès
Fretigney-et-Velloreille
Grandvelle-et-le-Perrenot
Lieffrans
Mailley-et-Chazelot
Mercey-sur-Saône
Neuvelle-lès-la-Charité
Noidans-le-Ferroux
Oiselay-et-Grachaux
Ovanches
Pontcey
Raze
La Romaine
Rosey
Rupt-sur-Saône
Sainte-Reine
Saint-Gand
Scey-sur-Saône-et-Saint-Albin
Seveux-Motey
Soing-Cubry-Charentenay
Traves
Vaux-le-Moncelot
Velle-le-Châtel
Velleguindry-et-Levrecey
Vellemoz
Vellexon-Queutrey-et-Vaudey
La Vernotte
Vy-le-Ferroux
Vy-lès-Rupt

References

Cantons of Haute-Saône